Phoenix P-12 Community College is a school located in the Ballarat suburb of Sebastopol, Victoria, Australia. It formed in 2011 with the amalgamation of Sebastopol College and Redan Primary School. The school was named after the Phoenix mine, located south of the school.

Curriculum 
The College has eight Key Learning Areas which are accessible to all students. The school is involved in the Bright Futures program and has curriculum program links with primary schools and further education providers.
This school also has had their PCG class dedicated to The Resilence Project due to Mental Health raising up in Modern days, however its unclear if this will continue 2023 onwards.

Grades Prep to 6
The Redan Campus of Phoenix P-12 Community College caters for children from Prep to Grade 6. The college boasts innovative ICT rich classrooms where skill development is undertaken through the use of iPads, laptops and interactive whiteboards.

Years 7 to 10
Students entering Year 7 can learn Chinese or German, and the opportunity to experience a broad range of Arts, Technology, Music and Physical Education programs. However, emphasis is placed on students' successful outcomes in all the Key Learning Areas from years 7 to 10.

Years 10 to 12
Students can undertake VCE, VET and VCAL studies. Arrangements with Technical and Further Education (TAFE) providers enable “credit transfer” and “dual recognition” of studies and programs provided at the College. The College has links with local industry and these provide work placed learning opportunities relevant to students and career pathways. The College is a registered provider of training programs.

Developing Other Talents and Skills (DOTS)
DOTS is a learning program designed to provide education and support to "vulnerable young people who have disengaged from or been excluded by schools or education providers, yet still have an aspiration to learn".

Students collaborate with their teacher to negotiate and develop an Individualised Learning Plan (ILP) which aims to meet each student’s needs, interests, abilities and aspirations. Students work on an independent academic program that adheres to the standards set by the Victorian Department of Education and Childhood Development.

Houses 
 Albion
 Picton
  Bonshaw
  Cornish

Sport 
PCC is a member of the Ballarat Associated Schools (BAS).

Notable alumni

Redan Primary School
Paul Jenkins (politician), former Australian politician of the Liberal Party

Sebastopol College
Erin Carroll, Australian badminton player

Jayson Poulton, CFO USA, Commonwealth Bank of Australia

Controversy
Many years ago before the 2 schools were united there was a stabbing at Sebastopol Collage where reports have came from parents that the school attempted to cover up from the media, there is also other reports suggesting the perpetrator was bullied by the victim and the school failed to put adequate effort into completely stopping the bullying. <ref>https://www.heraldsun.com.au/news/stab-school-hid-violent-history/news-story/76f8c23bdeb1c28a7ae12680dbacb2f8<ref>

See also 
 List of schools in Ballarat
 List of schools in Victoria
 List of high schools in Victoria
 Victorian Certificate of Education
 Education in Ballarat

External links 
 Phoenix College website

References

Secondary schools in Victoria (Australia)
Educational institutions established in 2011
Schools in Ballarat
2011 establishments in Australia